Vanessa Walters, (born 1978, in London, United Kingdom) is an English novelist and playwright. She is also a commentator and critic. She is best known as the teenage novelist discovered to be writing a novel as a hobby to share with her school friends. Educated at Queen's College, London, when discovered by teachers, the journal was passed over to an agent who quickly had her signed to a publishing company with a five-figure book deal even before she'd left.

The book, Rude Girls, made her a success, but instead of diving head long into the literary world she continued her studies, progressing to University. About Rude Girls, she said: "It was a book I really wanted to read, which didn't exist."

Rude Girls was acclaimed as an accurate portrayal of life in the North London Black community—it was a huge success straight across the board. Whilst studying law, Vanessa found time to spend a year in Paris and continue her writing. The Best Things in Life was published in 1998 and explored the lives of young Black women struggling to balance friendship, work and relationships.

Her book Smoke Othello! published 2008 is a collection of poems, short stories and plays about black experience in West London, born out of her time as the Writer in Residence for the Royal Borough of Kensington and Chelsea. She also performs her poetry.

She has also written plays.  Her works include Too Hot to Handle, Cold World, Caribbean Kitchen, Double Take, Changes and Michael X, produced by various English theater companies. Her commentary has also appeared on the guardian.co.uk website.

Her reviews have been broadcast on BBC Radio 4's Front Row Show as well as Sky News, BBC Four (Television), The World, More4 (The Cinema Show) and Colourful Radio.

Her articles have been published in The Guardian, New Statesman, The Voice and others including Pride Magazine for which she writes a monthly column on topical issues for black women.

References

20th-century English novelists
1978 births
Living people
People educated at Queen's College, London